Away is a 2016 British drama film directed by David Blair and starring Timothy Spall and Juno Temple.

The film premiered at the 2016 Edinburgh International Film Festival. It was released in the United Kingdom digitally on 8 May 2017 by 101 Films and on DVD on 15 May 2017 by Metrodome.

Premise
In Blackpool, an unlikely friendship blossoms between a lonely, suicidal widower and a young woman trying to escape an abusive ex-boyfriend.

Cast
 Timothy Spall as Joseph
 Juno Temple as Ria
 Matt Ryan as Dex
 Susan Lynch as Angie
 Hayley Squires as Kaz
 Tony Pitts as Col
 Terry Stone as landlord

Reception
Stephen Carty of Radio Times awarded the film two stars out of five.

Critical response
On review aggregator Rotten Tomatoes, the film has an approval rating of 60% based on 5 reviews, with an average rating of 5.5/10.

References

External links
 
 

2016 films
2016 drama films
2016 independent films
British drama films
British independent films
Films scored by Anne Dudley
Films set in Blackpool
Films directed by David Blair (director)
2010s English-language films
2010s British films